Beaufort County Schools could refer to one of the following:

 Beaufort County Schools (North Carolina) – Beaufort County, North Carolina
 Beaufort County Schools (South Carolina) – Beaufort County, South Carolina